Karalla daura, the goldstripe ponyfish, black slipmouth, black-finned slipmouth or pugnose pony, is a species of marine ray-finned fish, a ponyfish from the family Leiognathidae. It is native to the Indian Ocean and the western Pacific Ocean, from the Gulf of Aden to the Philippines. It is found in shallow water, mainly over muddy substrates where it normally occurs in schools. Its diet consists of polychaetes, bivalves, small crustaceans and sponges.

References

Fish of Thailand
Fish described in 1829
Taxa named by Georges Cuvier
Fish of the Indian Ocean
daura